Matthew Walshe (born 1 April 1970) was an English cricketer. He was a right-handed batsman and right-arm medium-fast bowler who played for Hertfordshire. He was born in Welwyn Garden City.

Walshe, who played in the Second XI Championship for Leicestershire, Somerset, and Essex, made a single list A appearance for Hertfordshire, in the 1993 NatWest Trophy. From the lower order, he scored a single run, and took bowling figures of 2-67.

Walshe continued to represent Hertfordshire in the Minor Counties Championship until 1995.

In 2006, Walshe made a single appearance for Finchley in the Evening Standard trophy.

External links
Matthew Walshe at CricketArchive 

1970 births
Living people
English cricketers
Hertfordshire cricketers
Sportspeople from Welwyn Garden City